Defiance is Deströyer 666's fourth full-length studio album.

Track listing 
 Weapons of Conquest - 03:03
 I Am Not Deceived - 04:37
 Blood For Blood - 05:14
 The Barricades Are Breaking - 03:38
 A Stand Defiant - 04:46
 The Path to Conflict - 04:37
 A Thousand Plagues - 04:24
 Human All Too Human - 06:04
 A Sermon To The Dead - 05:04

Credits 
K.K. Warslut - Vocals, Guitar
Ian Gray - Guitar
Matt Schneemilch - Bass
Mersus - Drums

References

Deströyer 666 albums
2009 albums
Season of Mist albums